Utricularia determannii is a very small, probably perennial, rheophytic carnivorous plant that belongs to the genus Utricularia. U. determannii is endemic to Suriname, where it is only known from the type location in the Wilhelmina Mountains. It has been collected in flower in July. It was originally described and published by Peter Taylor in 1986 and named in honor of the American collector R. O. Determann.

See also 
 List of Utricularia species

References 

Carnivorous plants of South America
Flora of Suriname
determannii